Naadodigal 2 is a 2020 Indian Tamil-language drama film written and directed by Samuthirakani and produced by  S Nandagopal under the banner of Madras Enterprises. It stars Sasikumar and Anjali. The film released on 31 January 2020. The film is a namesake sequel to the highly successful 2009 film Naadodigal.

Plot 
Jeeva is a passionate socialist who speaks out against issues in his village with his friends Sengodi, Priya, and Paandi. Sengodi is a doctor, while Priya is studying to be a Sub-Inspector of Police. After seeing an honour killing video online, Jeeva organises a massive gathering for people who hate caste and tells them to dress in red. This angers the local caste leader/chieftain, who mixes ruffians dressed in the red dress code and thugs dressed as police officers; they cause a violent riot among the youngsters. The news of the violence reaches his uncle and his mother, who cancel the alliance with a prospective family. At the same time, Priya successfully becomes the first transgender Sub-Inspector of Police. She also reunites with her parents, who disowned her at a young age. After the cancelled betrothal, Jeeva's uncle organises an alliance with a girl and her family from the neighbouring village of Keeripatti. Jeeva looks at the photo of the girl, Sowmya, and immediately falls in love with her. Eventually, they get married.

However, on the wedding night, Jeeva sees Sowmya slitting her wrists with a blade. She then reveals her story. Her parents forced her to marry Jeeva or they would kill her love. The group go to see the boy that Sowmya loves, who got badly beaten. He says that he and Sowmya are from different castes, and Sowmya fell in love with him. He does not want to be a victim of caste mania. Jeeva then brings the two of them together and gets them married. They both get in a car and drive off.

The villagers become agitated after Sowmya's disappearance. Jeeva then reveals to the villagers that he was the one who sent her off. This causes a massive fight between Jeeva and the caste-supporting villagers. Sengodi's father, Tamilarasan, fights the goons and saves Jeeva. After the villagers create fear in life, Paandi reveals the couple are in Andhra Pradesh, in Samara Simha Reddy's house; they are really hiding at "Selfie" Chinnamani's house in the village. Meanwhile, Sowmya's relatives search all over South India for the couple. Eventually, Chinnamani leaves the couple in Thrissur.

Meanwhile, Jeeva's elderly friend convinces Sengodi and Jeeva to marry because they have similar principles, philosophies, and lifestyles. Sengodi's family accepts Jeeva as their future son-in-law. Priya gets transferred to Jeeva's village. Jeeva fights for 'no caste' and to hold a 'no caste' convention at the Madras High Court after the district court rejected their plea. Sowmya becomes pregnant but she gets upset because she feels alone without their relatives. When Jeeva's friends are planning Jeeva's wedding, Chinnamani arrives looking dull. He tells what happened. Sowmya's husband allows her to call home, and her relatives find their address to bring them home. Jeeva and his friends become upset that they are going to be betrayed by their close relatives.

Sowmya reveals to her family that she is pregnant. Sowmya's aunt also tells Sowmya not to communicate with Jeeva, otherwise, it will cause unnecessary problems. Sowmya tells Jeeva directly not to disturb them. At the same time, Jeeva's villagers meet the caste chieftain to discuss what to do, and the chieftain gives them money. They are planning to organise men to kill the couple as part of an honour killing out of respect for their caste. Priya spots two of the henchmen hired as killers and catches them. She forces one of the henchmen to reveal their plan to her, and Priya tells the plan to Jeeva.

Soon, the henchmen hack the couple brutally in the city centre causing them to bleed profusely. Jeeva and Paandi arrive just in time. They fight the henchmen and load them onto a coach. On the Dindigul highway, Paandi helps transfer the couple onto a different coach and takes them to the hospital. Vikram informs Sengodi that they are at the hospital. Jeeva fights the henchmen but spares them.

After two years, the court allows them to hold the no-caste convention for people against the caste. Sowmya and her husband are living happily with a baby girl. Furthermore, Sengodi and Jeeva are also happily married and have a baby daughter.

Cast 

 Sasikumar as Jeeva
 Anjali as Sengodi
 Athulya Ravi as Soumya
 Bharani as Paandi
 Pawan as Soumya's uncle
 Esakki Barath as Soumya's lover
 Vikram Anand as Vikram
 E. Ramdoss as Jeeva's uncle
 Namitha Marimuthu as Priya
 Tulasi as Jeeva's mother
 Sriranjani as Sengodi's mother
 Subhashini Kannan as Soumya's aunt
 Lizzie Antony as Soumya's mother
 Madhushree as  Soumya's cousin
 G. Gnanasambandam as Mariyadum Perumal
 Namo Narayana as Selfie Chinnamani
 Anil Murali
 Thavasi as Priya's father
 Pichaikkaran Moorthy
 Porali Dileepan as Police inspector
 Naadodigal Gopal as Gopal
 V. K. Vijayakumar as Villager
 Benjamin as Head constable
 Pallavarajan as Sakthi
 Samuthirakani as Bus driver (special appearance; also voice-over)

Production 
The announcement of the film was made in early January 2018 by director Samuthirakani but refused earlier that the film will not be a sequel to the film Naadodigal. The production of the film went on floors in March 2018. Samuthirakani also revealed that the film would be quite similar to the first part but with a different storyline. Bharani and Namo Narayana who were part of the prequel film were also added to the cast.

While being busy with the shooting for the film Naadodigal 2, a sequel to the 2009 film Naadodigal, M. Sasikumar chose to work with the director Maruthupandian for the film Asuravadham. The post production of the film was completed in around June 2018.

Soundtrack 

The film's soundtrack is composed by Justin Prabhakaran who earlier  composed for the director's Thondan, replacing Sundar C Babu who worked as the music director of the film's predecessor. The album features seven songs, with lyrics for the film are written by Yugabharathi, G. Logan and Arivu. The song "Shambo Shiva Shambo" from the predecessor was used in the film. The audio rights of the film are secured by Sony Music India.

The first single track, titled "Adhuva Adhuva" was released on 18 July 2019. The remaining songs and the full album was released on 19 September 2019 at Prasad Film Labs, with the album was made available at music streaming platforms on the next day.

Distribution
On 24 January 2020, the producers announced that Linda Big Pictures was selected as the film's distribution partner for Tamil Nadu region, followed by Red Giant Movies for City and Salem region, Dhanam Pictures for Chengalpet region, S Picture for North and South Arcot region and Gopuram Films for Coimbatore and Madurai region.

Release
Initially, it was slated for July 2019 release, but later postponed. It was announced by the producer that the film will be released on 31 January 2020. The Satellite Rights Of the Film Was Acquired By Sun TV.

References

External links 

2020 films
2020s Tamil-language films
Indian drama films
Films shot in Madurai
Films directed by Samuthirakani
Indian sequel films
2020 drama films